Diplonaevia is a genus of fungi in the family Dermateaceae. The genus, first described by Italian mycologist Pier Andrea Saccardo in 1888, contains 23 species.

See also 

 List of Dermateaceae genera

References

External links 

 Diplonaevia at Index Fungorum

Dermateaceae genera